Nagia subterminalis is a species of moth in the family Erebidae. It is found on Luzon in the Philippines.

References

Nagia
Moths described in 1921
Moths of Asia